The Minō Toll Road (箕面有料道路 Minō Yūryōdōro) is a two-lane toll road in Minoh, Osaka that connects the Shin-Meishin Expressway to the southern limits of the city via a tunnel under Mount Minō.

History
The Minō Toll Road was opened to traffic on 30 May 2007 between its southern terminus at Osaka Route 9 and the northern terminus at the main line of Japan National Route 423. On 10 December 2017 the toll road was connected to the Shin-Meishin Expressway at the northern terminus of the toll road in addition to the already built junction with National Route 423.

Junction list
The entire toll road is in Osaka Prefecture.

|colspan="8" style="text-align: center;"|Through to

References

External links
 Osaka Prefectural Road Corporation

Toll roads in Japan
Roads in Osaka Prefecture